Yemelyanov Dor is a rural locality (a village) in Gorodetskoye Rural Settlement, Kichmengsko-Gorodetsky District, Vologda Oblast, Russia. The population was 92 as of 2002.

Geography 
Yemelyanov Dor is located 29 km southwest of Kichmengsky Gorodok (the district's administrative centre) by road. Zabolotny is the nearest rural locality.

References 

Rural localities in Kichmengsko-Gorodetsky District